Sali is a town and commune in Reggane District, Adrar Province, south-central Algeria. According to the 2008 census it has a population of 13,138, up from 11,304 in 1998, with an annual growth rate of 1.5%.

Geography

These oases form part of a long longer string of oases known as the Tuat region, running from north to south through Adrar Province. Beyond the oases, the sandy Erg Chech desert lies to the west and the rocky Tademaït plateau lies to the east.

Climate

Sali has a hot desert climate (Köppen climate classification BWh), with extremely hot summers and mild winters, and very little precipitation throughout the year.

Transportation

The main road in Sali commune is the N6 national highway, which runs through the commune from north-northwest to south-southeast, and connects to Adrar in the north and Reggane in the south. The villages of the commune are connected to the highway by short local roads.

Education

5.1% of the population has a tertiary education, and another 12.7% has completed secondary education. The overall literacy rate is 74.1%, and is 88.0% among males and 60.3% among females.

Localities
As of 1984, the commune was composed of 17 localities:

Bab Allah
El Mansour
Bermata
Kasbet Moulay Ali
Kasbet Ennadjar
El Meharza
Kasbet Djenna Allouchia
Kasbet Sidi Cherif
Oulay Moulay Abdelouahab
Ksar Eldjdid
Kasbet Bassidi
Ouled Moulay El Arbi
Tinnourt
Berriche
Bahou
El Mestour
Zaouit Lahchef

References 

Neighbouring towns and cities

Communes of Adrar Province
Cities in Algeria
Algeria